Neuzina diminuta is a species of fly in the family Sciomyzidae. It is the only species in the genus Neuzina.

References

Sciomyzidae
Insects described in 2004